The 2000–01 Grand Prix of Figure Skating Final was held at the Yoyogi National Gymnasium in Tokyo, Japan from February 15 through 18, 2001. It was the culmination of the 2000–01 Grand Prix Series. Skaters qualified for the event by accumulating points throughout the season. The events of the series were the 2000 Skate America, the 2000 Skate Canada International, the 2000 Sparkassen Cup on Ice, the 2000 Cup of Russia, the 2000 Trophée Lalique, and the 2000 NHK Trophy. The top six skaters in the disciplines of men's singles, ladies' singles, pair skating, and ice dancing met at the final to crown the Grand Prix Final Champion.

The format of the event differed from other years. Skaters competed in the short program and the free skating, and then competed head-to-head in different free skating finals. The top two finishers at that point in the competition competed against each other in a Super Final (SF).

Results

Men

Ladies

Pairs

Ice dancing

External links
 2000–01 Grand Prix of Figure Skating Final

2000 in figure skating
2001 in figure skating
Grand Prix of Figure Skating Final
Grand Prix of Figure Skating Final